Massachusetts Senate's Hampshire, Franklin and Worcester district in the United States is one of 40 legislative districts of the Massachusetts Senate. It covers portions of Franklin, Hampshire, and Worcester counties. Since 2019 it is represented in the State Senate by Joanne M. Comerford of the Democratic Party. Comerford is running unopposed for re-election in the 2020 Massachusetts general election.

Towns represented
The district includes the following localities:
 Amherst
 Bernardston
 Colrain
 Deerfield
 Erving
 Gill
 Greenfield
 Hadley
 Hatfield
 Leverett
 Leyden
 Montague
 New Salem
 Northampton
 Northfield
 Orange
 Pelham
 Royalston
 Shutesbury
 South Hadley
 Sunderland
 Warwick
 Wendell
 Whately

The current district geographic boundary overlaps with those of the Massachusetts House of Representatives' 2nd Berkshire, 1st Franklin, 2nd Franklin, 1st Hampshire, 2nd Hampshire, and 3rd Hampshire districts.

Senators 
 Stanley C. Rosenberg
 Joanne M. Comerford, 2019-current

See also
 List of Massachusetts Senate elections
 List of Massachusetts General Courts
 List of former districts of the Massachusetts Senate

References

External links
 Ballotpedia
  (State Senate district information based on U.S. Census Bureau's American Community Survey).

Senate
Government in Worcester County, Massachusetts
Government of Franklin County, Massachusetts
Government of Hampshire County, Massachusetts
Massachusetts Senate